The fourth season of Deutschland sucht den Superstar was aired on German channel RTL from February to May 2007. Mark Medlock, the season's winner, was awarded a contract with Sony BMG. The judges in this season were Dieter Bohlen, Heinz Henn, Anja Lukaseder. It was hosted by Marco Schreyl and Tooske Ragas. The viewers chose the contestant's fates as they were able to call for their favorite contestant. The voting results were published on 7 May. The winner got a 10-year contract and €100,000. Twenty percent went to the winner's manager who was chosen by the creators.

Finalists
(Ages stated at time of contest)

Controversies
Contestant Lisa Bund caused a controversy on 10 March when the headline of the German tabloid newspaper Bild read that she fought with bullying, and harassment by some of the other contestants. On 14 March, Bild Online reported about a loud argument between Bund and former contestant Tristan Iser, which happened to have also been filmed by a mobile phone camera. Bund stated in an online diary entry that she felt the video was "like a bad horror movie".

On 22 April, Bild announced that contestant Max Buskohl quit the competition due to RTL's rejection of his request to let his school band Empty Trash get a recording contract alongside him. Viewers had wondered about judge Dieter Bohlen's uncharacteristic behavior when he gave an extremely critical review of Buskohl's performance on 21 April. Buskohl is alleged to have said that Bohlen was antisocial, which explains Bohlen's negative reaction.

Contestant Martin Stosch, who was eliminated on 21 April, remained as a contestant despite being voted off the week prior, replacing Buskohl. However, Buskohl's father Carl Carlton told Spiegel Online that his son already made his decision to leave on 19 April but waited until Sunday to make his announcement at request of RTL.

Judges Dieter Bohlen and Heinz Henn had started a quarrel with each other during the show. On 14 April's show, Henn made it clear that he did not agree with contestant Mark Medlock's song choices. Bohlen, a staunch supporter of Medlock, began imitating Henn during his review of Lisa Bund's performance. Henn later stated that he thought it was "in bad taste, in bad style and disrespectful towards the contestants".

On 24 April, German entertainer Stefan Raab announced a performance by Buskohl set for 25 April at his show TV total which at that time aired on RTL's rival television channel ProSieben. RTL pronounced against a performance by Buskohl and his band Empty Trash on TV total the next day. So during his show on 25 and 26 April, Raab publicly instigated a protest demonstration set for Saturday's Deutschland sucht den Superstar show and was said to have obtained about 120 tickets. However the show eventually went off without any disturbance.

Top 20

1st Top 20 Show (Boys)
Original airdate: 7 February 2007

Bottom four: Jonathan Enns, Aleksan Cetinkaya, Arcangelo Vigneri, Lindsay Stebe
Eliminated: Aleksan Cetinkaya and Lindsay Stebe
Judges' forecasts: Aleksan Cetinkaya and Lindsay Stebe (Bohlen, Lukaseder, Henn)

2nd Top 20 Show (Girls)
Original airdate: 10 February 2007

Bottom five: Julia Falke, Dominika Mrugala, Madeleine Boly, Sarah Jahncke, Nebiha Celenler
Eliminated: Nebiha Celenler, Madeleine Boly, Dominika Mrugala
Judges' forecasts: Nebiha Celenler, Madeleine Boly, Dominika Mrugala (Bohlen, Lukaseder, Henn)

3rd Top 20 Show (Boys)
Original airdate: 15 February 2007

Tristan Iser is there for Roman Lob, who withdrew due to illness. Eventually, Lob was asked back for the season 5 theme shows, but declined due to his studies.

Bottom five: Jonathan Enns, Arcangelo Vigneri, Tristan Iser, Martin Stosch, Dennis Haberlach
Eliminated: Dennis Haberlash, Arcangelo Vigneri, Tristan Iser
Judges' forecasts: Jonathan Enns, Martin Stosch, Tristan Iser (Bohlen, Lukaseder, Henn)

4th Top 20 Show (Girls)
Original airdate: 17 February 2007

Bottom four: Sarah Jahncke, Laura Martin, Priscilla Harris, Julia Falke
Eliminated: Sarah Jahncke and Priscilla Harris
Judges' forecasts: Sarah Jahncke and Priscilla Harris (Bohlen, Lukaseder, Henn)

Finals

1st Theme Show: "Die größten Hits aller Zeiten" (Greatest Hits of All Time)
Original airdate: 24 February 2007

Bottom four: Laura Martin, Julia Falke, Jonathan Enns, Martin Stosch
Eliminated: Laura Martin
Judges' forecasts: Laura Martin (Bohlen), Jonathan Enns (Henn, Lukaseder)

2nd Theme Show: "Die größten Hits der 80er und 90er" (Greatest Hits of the 80s and 90s)
Original airdate: 10 March 2007

Bottom four: Thomas Enns, Martin Stosch, Max Buskohl, Jonathan Enns
Eliminated: Jonathan Enns
Judges' forecasts: Julia Falke (Lukaseder, Bohlen), Jonathan Enns (Henn)

3rd Theme Show: "Power of Love"
Original airdate: 17 March

On 19 March 2007 a CD featuring all of the songs from the show and an additional version of If You Don't Know Me By Now by Simply Red sung by all contestants was released.

Bottom four: Lauren Talbot, Julia Falke, Martin Stosch, Thomas Enns
Eliminated: Julia Falke
Judges' forecasts: Julia Falke (Bohlen, Henn, Lukaseder)

4th Theme Show: "Hits von heute" (Today's Hits)
Original airdate: 31 March 2007

For the first time in the history of Deutschland sucht den Superstar the show aired at the same time as "Wetten, dass..?" (one of the most successful TV shows in Europe) on the public channel ZDF.

Bottom four: Martin Stosch, Lauren Talbot, Thomas Enns, Francisca Urio
Eliminated: Francisca Urio
Judges' forecasts: Lauren Talbot (Bohlen, Henn, Lukaseder)

Beside the show's contestants another casting candidate was eventually given the chance to perform on stage namely Menderes Bagcı who had come to every season's casting audition never getting an admission ticket for the casting call-back. He performed Beat It by Michael Jackson on stage.

The viewers' decision in this episode came as a complete surprise, as Urio, who was eliminated this time, ranked among this season's best and most favored contestants. Before the decision, jury member Dieter Bohlen ironically predicted Urio's elimination in what he thought was an April fool hoax. Subsequently, he and his co-judges watched the decision with dismay and shock written all over their faces.

5th Theme Show: "Big Band"
Original airdate: 7 April 2007

This was the first theme show to be co-hosted by female host Tooske Ragas along with Marco Schreyl in this season of Deutschland sucht den Superstar. Ragas gave birth to her daughter and was not able to present the first four theme shows.

Bottom four: Thomas Enns, Martin Stosch, Lauren Talbot, Lisa Bund
Eliminated: Thomas Enns
Judges' forecasts: Thomas Enns (Bohlen, Henn, Lukaseder)

6th Theme Show: "Die größten Diven und Helden der Musik" (Greatest Divas and Heroes of Music)
Original airdate: 14 April 2007

Bottom three: Martin Stosch, Max Buskohl, Lauren Talbot
Eliminated: Lauren Talbot
Judges' forecasts: Mark Medlock (Henn), Lauren Talbot (Bohlen), Martin Stosch (Lukaseder)

Once again Menderes Bagcı was given the permission to perform on stage. This time he chose Bad by Michael Jackson.

7th Theme Show: "Hits der 70er / Dedicated to…" (Hits of the 70s / Dedicated to…)
Original airdate: 21 April 2007

Bottom three: Max Buskohl, Martin Stosch, Lisa Bund
Eliminated: Martin Stosch
Judges' forecasts: Martin Stosch (Henn, Lukaseder, Bohlen)

On 22 April, Bild newspaper announced that contestant Max Buskohl was dismissed by RTL Television afterwards. (See Controversies.)

8th Theme Show: "Songs der Jury" (Judges' Choice)
Original airdate: 28 April 2007

Bottom three: Lisa Bund, Martin Stosch, Mark Medlock
Eliminated: Lisa Bund
Judges' forecasts: Martin Stosch (Bohlen, Lukaseder, Henn)

9th Theme Show: Final
Original airdate: 5 May 2007

The two finalists performed Elton John's and George Michael's Don't Let the Sun Go Down on Me together on stage.

Winner: Mark Medlock
Runner-up: Martin Stosch
Judges' forecasts of who would win: Mark Medlock (Lukaseder, Bohlen), irresolute (Henn)

Top 10 candidates

Mark Medlock
Mark Medlock, born on 9 July 1978 in Frankfurt, was the winner of the 4th season. His father Lauria immigrated from Georgia, United States, and was a gospel singer. Medlock is openly gay. Prior to his participation of Deutschland sucht den Superstar, he worked as a nurse.

Martin Stosch
Martin Stosch was born on 30 July 1990 in Landshut. He was the youngest male contestant of the show. Being voted out in the seventh theme show, he returned as a replacement for Max Buskohl, who quit the contest by his own will after having serious disagreements with jury member Dieter Bohlen.

Lisa Bund
Lisa Bund was born 31 May 1988 in Frankfurt. He received a lot of promotional support by the German media. She later signed a recording contract and released her first single "Learn to Love You" on 31 August 2007.

Max Buskohl
Max Buskohl is from Berlin. He auditioned for DSDS because he lost a bet. He was part of a band called Empty Trash. He stated in an interview with Der Spiegel that he left DSDS voluntarily, while RTL claims they threw out Max.

Lauren Talbot
Lauren Talbot was born on 15 March 1990 in Hanover. She was the youngest female contestant in season 4.

Francisca Urio
Francisca Urio, born on 6 February 1981 in Meiningen, is an only child to a German mother and a Tanzanian father.

Julia Falke
Julia Falke was born on 21 June 1988 in Schärding, Austria.

Elimination chart

Note:
 Bottom 3/4 indicates that the contestant was 'saved' last. The Bottom Group results are based on published results after the show that determined the number of percentages for each contestant. This may or may not indicate his or her actual vote rank.
Martin Stosch brought back when Max Buskohl withdrew from the competition.
Roman Lob withdrew from the competition due to illness in the second Top 20 show and was replaced by Tristan Iser.

References

External links
Official page at RTL
Deutschland sucht den Superstar at IMDb

Season 04
2007 German television seasons
2007 in German music